Gordy Presnell (born July 7, 1960) is the women's basketball coach for Boise State University since 2005. Before joining Boise State, Presnell coached boys basketball teams for Lapwai High School and Kendrick High School during the 1980s. After joining Seattle Pacific University as a graduate assistant in 1986, Presnell became their women's basketball coach in 1987. With Seattle Pacific, Presnell's team won three Pacific West Conference events and reached the final of the 2005 NCAA Division II women's basketball tournament. Upon leaving the team in 2005, Presnell had 396 wins and 127 losses.

From 2007 to 2020, Presnell's team won the WAC women's basketball tournament once and the Mountain West Conference women's basketball tournament five times. In between this time period, Presnell and his team reached the second round of the 2008 Women's National Invitation Tournament and the 2014 Women's Basketball Invitational. With the two schools, Presnell received nine conference Coach of the Year awards from the 1990s to 2019. For Division II schools, Presnell won the WBCA National Coach of the Year Award in 2003 and 2004. As a women's basketball coach, Presnell won his 700th game in 2021.

Early life and education
Presnell was born in Lapwai, Idaho on July 7, 1960. He started his basketball experience as a child while living at the Nez Perce Reservation. During his studies at Northwest Nazarene University, Presnell continued to play basketball throughout the early 1980s. He also briefly attended the University of Idaho in 1986. In the late 1980s, Presnell completed his education at Seattle Pacific University.

Career

Early career
In the mid 1980s, Presnell was an assistant coach with Lapwai High School and Kendrick High School when they won Idaho championships in boys basketball. During this time period, Lapwai was the A-3 division winner in 1984 and Kendrick was the A-4 division winner in 1985. As the boys basketball coach for Kendrick, Presnell and his team were fifth at the A-4 division of the 1986 Idaho championships.

Seattle Pacific
In 1986, Presnell wanted to join the men's basketball team at Idaho and become a manager. After deciding to leave Idaho for Seattle Pacific that year, Presnell worked in men's basketball as a graduate assistant. Starting in 1987, Presnell was the women's basketball coach for Seattle Pacific when they competed in the NAIA. While working as a coach for Seattle Pacific, Presnell also stocked ice cream trucks until 1989.

In 1991, Presnell's team began playing in the NCAA Division II. During the early 1990s, Seattle Pacific played in the Continental Divide Conference before joining the Pacific West Conference upon its creation in 1992. While in the Pacific West, Presnell's team won the conference in 1997 and 1998. Seattle Pacific won an additional Pacific West title in women's basketball during 2001.

That year, Seattle Pacific was scheduled to move into the newly established Great Northwest Athletic Conference. In 2019, Presnell said he had been a candidate to work at Pepperdine University, Oregon State University and Boise State University by 2002. While part of the GNAC, Presnell and Seattle Pacific reached the final of the 2005 NCAA Division II women's basketball tournament in March 2005. That month, Presnell was considered by Montana State University to become their women's basketball coach. Upon leaving the team in June 2005, Presnell had accumulated 396 wins and 127 losses with Seattle Pacific.

Boise State
Presnell became the coach of the women's basketball team at Boise State University in 2005. While with Boise State, Presnell and the team were the 2007 WAC women's basketball tournament champions. That year, Presnell was a potential replacement for Sherri Murrell as the coach for their women's basketball team at Washington State University. Between 2015 to 2020, Presnell and his team won the Mountain West Conference women's basketball tournament five times.

At the NCAA Division I women's basketball tournament, Presnell and his team reached the first round in 2007. In the early 2010s, Presnell considered taking a sabbatical to look after his ill mother. From 2015 to 2019, Presnell and Boise State appeared in four more NCAA Tournaments. Presnell's team had received a spot in the 2020 edition before the COVID-19 pandemic stopped the NCAA event from happening. During this time period, Boise State reached the second round of the 2008 Women's National Invitation Tournament and the 2014 Women's Basketball Invitational. By 2022, Presnell had 317 wins and 211 losses with Boise State.

Awards
In women's basketball, Presnell was Coach of the Year three times for Seattle Pacific as a member of the Pacific West Conference during the 1990s. He received an additional Coach of the Year award from the PWC in 2001. In the GNAC, Presnell was named Coach of the Year consecutively from 2003 to 2005.

During this time period, he won the WBCA National Coach of the Year Award in 2003 and 2004 for Division II schools. While at Boise State, Presnell received the 2007 Coach of the Year award with the Western Athletic Conference. He also was named Coach of the Year for the Mountain West Conference in 2019.

Overall performance and personal life
Overall, Presnell won his 600th women's basketball game in 2016. In 2021, he won his 700th game. Presnell has two kids and is married.

References

1960 births
High school basketball coaches in Idaho
Seattle Pacific Falcons women's basketball coaches
Boise State Broncos women's basketball coaches
Living people